Vorony Sumy is a semi-professional ice hockey team in Sumy, Ukraine. The club was founded in 2002 as Sums’ki Vorony Sumy, and played in the Ukrainian Hockey League in the 2010/2011 season.

External links 
Vorony Sumy details at eurohockey.com
Ворони (Суми) - 2010-2011 Чемпіонат України. Вища ліга 

Ice hockey teams in Ukraine
Sport in Sumy